Eubranchus conicla is a species of sea slug or nudibranch, a marine gastropod mollusc in the family Eubranchidae.

Taxonomy
Eubranchus convenientis Ortea & Caballer, 2002 was described from Manzanillo, Limón, Costa Rica. Eubranchus convenientis is considered as a synonym of Eubranchus conicla.

Distribution
This species was described from Ubatuba and Ilhabela, São Paulo state, Brasil. It has been reported from Florida, Honduras, Costa Rica, Venezuela, Jamaica, Barbados, Tobago, Brazil and Panama.

Description 
Body is elongate. Rhinophores are smooth. Oral tentacles are short. Cerata are tuberculate, few in number, arranged in two simple rows. Background color is translucent gray or brown with numerous white dots. Rhinophores and oral tentacles are sometimes ringed with brown. Cerata are white, sometimes with brown or green spots. The maximum recorded body length is 4 mm.

Ecology 
Minimum recorded depth is 0 m. Maximum recorded depth is 3 m. Found on Sargassum in Panama.

References
This article incorporates Creative Commons (CC-BY-4.0) text from the reference

External links
 Turgeon, D.; Quinn, J.F.; Bogan, A.E.; Coan, E.V.; Hochberg, F.G.; Lyons, W.G.; Mikkelsen, P.M.; Neves, R.J.; Roper, C.F.E.; Rosenberg, G.; Roth, B.; Scheltema, A.; Thompson, F.G.; Vecchione, M.; Williams, J.D. (1998). Common and scientific names of aquatic invertebrates from the United States and Canada: mollusks. 2nd ed. American Fisheries Society Special Publication, 26. American Fisheries Society: Bethesda, MD (USA). . IX, 526 + cd-rom pp.

Eubranchidae
Gastropods described in 1958
Taxa named by Ernst Marcus (zoologist)